The following lists are of massacres that have occurred in Azerbaijan (numbers may be approximate).

Before 1988

Nagorno-Karabakh conflict
The following is a list of massacres and pogroms, which took place in the course of the First Nagorno-Karabakh War and the 2020 Nagorno-Karabakh War between Armenians and Azerbaijanis.

References

Massacres
Azerbaijan

Massacres